Bronisław Makowski (25 May 1905 – 25 May 1944) was a Polish footballer. He played in one match for the Poland national football team in 1931. A resistance member during World War II, he was arrested and executed by the Gestapo on his 39th birthday.

References

External links
 

1905 births
1944 deaths
Polish footballers
Poland international footballers
Place of birth missing
Association footballers not categorized by position
Polish resistance members of World War II
Polish people executed by Nazi Germany
People executed by Nazi Germany by firing squad
Resistance members killed by Nazi Germany